Alex Anzalone (born September 22, 1994) is an American football middle linebacker for the Detroit Lions of the National Football League (NFL). He played college football at Florida. He was drafted by the New Orleans Saints in the third round of the 2017 NFL Draft.

College career
Anzalone played college football at Florida from 2013 to 2016.

Professional career

New Orleans Saints
The New Orleans Saints selected Anzalone in the third round (76th overall) of the 2017 NFL Draft. He was the tenth linebacker selected in 2017.

On June 2, 2017, the New Orleans Saints signed Anzalone to a four-year, $3.46 million contract that included a signing bonus of $864,592.

Anzalone earned a starting outside linebacker job for the Saints as a rookie, starting all four games in which he played. In Week 4 against the Dolphins, he suffered a shoulder injury and was placed on injured reserve on October 4, 2017.

After playing in all 16 games in the 2018 season, Anzalone was placed on injured reserve on September 16, 2019.

Detroit Lions
Anzalone signed with the Detroit Lions on March 24, 2021. He entered the 2021 season as a starting linebacker. He started the first 14 games before suffering a shoulder injury in Week 15. He was placed on injured reserve on December 20.

In March, 2022, Anzalone re-signed with the Lions.

On March 13, 2023, Anzalone signed a three-year, $18.75 million contract extension with the Lions.

References

External links
Florida Gators bio
New Orleans Saints bio

1994 births
Living people
American football linebackers
Detroit Lions players
Florida Gators football players
New Orleans Saints players
People from Wyomissing, Pennsylvania
Players of American football from Pennsylvania
Sportspeople from the Delaware Valley